Louis Dufour Sr. (1873 – 12 April 1944) was a Swiss ice hockey player. He competed in the men's tournament at the 1920 Summer Olympics, along with his son Louis Dufour Jr. Dufour was also a co-founder of the Swiss Ice Hockey Association.

References

External links
 

1873 births
1944 deaths
Ice hockey players at the 1920 Summer Olympics
Olympic ice hockey players of Switzerland
Place of birth missing